Costa Ártabra, or Golfo Ártabro, is a coastal area of Galicia, Spain. The Romans knew it as Portus Magnus Artaborum and amongst other historical references it is worth mentioning Pomponius Mela, a Roman historian who wrote in the year AD 43.

Costa Ártabra also the name of a nature reserve, a "Special Area of Conservation". This is one of the areas in which the rare Kerry Slug is known to occur.

References

Coasts of Spain
Landforms of Galicia (Spain)